The men's 100 kilograms (half heavyweight) competition at the 2010 Asian Games in Guangzhou was held on 13 November at the Huagong Gymnasium.

Schedule
All times are China Standard Time (UTC+08:00)

Results
Legend
WO — Won by walkover

Main bracket

Final

Top half

Bottom half

Repechage

References

Results

External links
Draw

M100
Judo at the Asian Games Men's Half Heavyweight